The Class B20 is a type of 0-4-0T steam locomotive built for the Japanese Government Railways during the period 1944-47. They were built by Tateyama Heavy Industries who manufactured a total of fifteen Class B20 locomotives.

Preserved examples
 B20 1 - Iwamizawa, Hokkaidō
 B20 10 - At Umekoji Steam Locomotive Museum in Kyoto.

See also
 Japan Railways locomotive numbering and classification

1067 mm gauge locomotives of Japan
Steam locomotives of Japan
0-4-0T locomotives
Preserved steam locomotives of Japan
Railway locomotives introduced in 1944
Shunting locomotives